Gunner Jay Lindberg (born March 1, 1975) is an American convicted murderer on death row in California. Lindberg was convicted of the 1996 murder of 24-year-old Vietnamese American Thien Minh Ly in Tustin, California.

Lindberg wanted to celebrate that evening's Super Bowl victory by the Dallas Cowboys by finding "a Jap". Lindberg and an accomplice, 17-year-old Domenic Michael Christopher, encountered Ly, who was rollerblading around the tennis courts at Tustin High School. Lindberg and Christopher trapped Ly on the courts, beat him, kicked him, and then stabbed him many times. Prosecutors also charged Lindberg with a hate crime and bullying. Before that, Lindberg served most of a five-year prison sentence for another first-degree assault after shooting an 11-year-old boy three times with a pellet gun in 1992.

On August 29, 2008, the California Supreme Court affirmed Lindberg's convictions and death sentence.

See also
 List of death row inmates in the United States

References

1975 births
Living people
American people convicted of murder
American prisoners sentenced to death
Prisoners sentenced to death by California
People convicted of murder by California
People convicted of hate crimes
San Quentin State Prison inmates
American people of German descent
Racially motivated violence against Asian-Americans